Savo Pređa was a Serbian Partisan general in World War II and, later, governor of Bileća prison. He was also a director of OZNA for eastern Bosnia for a short period, after that, he was deputy minister of interior. Savo was well known for being close to Aleksandar Ranković. He was also the establisher of the Yugoslavian automobile-motor association. He was one of the leaders of the team that caught Serbian Chetnik leader Draža Mihajlović. Pređa wrote the script for the movie Walter Defends Sarajevo, that used to be very popular in former Yugoslavia and China.

Yugoslav military personnel of World War II
Yugoslav Partisans members
Serbian prison administrators
Year of birth missing
Year of death missing